Paty Yeye Lenkebe  (born February 2, 1982) is a retired Congolese footballer who last played for Israeli side Maccabi Ahi Nazareth.

External links

1982 births
Living people
Democratic Republic of the Congo footballers
Association football defenders
AS Vita Club players
Maccabi Herzliya F.C. players
Bnei Sakhnin F.C. players
F.C. Ashdod players
Maccabi Ahi Nazareth F.C. players
Expatriate footballers in Israel
Israeli Premier League players
Liga Leumit players
Democratic Republic of the Congo expatriate footballers
Democratic Republic of the Congo expatriate sportspeople in Israel
Democratic Republic of the Congo international footballers